Inverclyde Central is one of the seven wards used to elect members of the Inverclyde Council. It elects three Councillors.

The ward includes eastern parts of the town of Greenock, with neighbourhoods such as Bridgend, Cartsdyke, Ladyburn, Overton and Strone, plus parts of the town centre (south of the Inverclyde Line railway tracks, east of Bank Street, south of Wellington Street and east of Broomhill Street). In 2019, the ward had a population of 11,926.

Councillors

Election Results

2022 Election
2022 Inverclyde Council election

2017 Election
2017 Inverclyde Council election

References

Wards of Inverclyde
Greenock
2017 establishments in Scotland